Lady Hayakawa (早川殿, Hayakawa-Dono, died April 4, 1613) was a Japanese woman and aristocrat of the Sengoku period. Hayakawa is a common nickname for one of Daimyō Hōjō Ujiyasu's daughters, who lived in the Sengoku through early Edo periods. She is best known for marrying into the Imagawa clan as a condition for The Kōsōsun Triple Alliance, an alliance which put daughters of the Takeda, Imagawa and Hojo clans into political marriages.  The formation of the alliance would later change the fate of these three powerful clans.

Life 
Elder daughter of Hōjō Ujiyasu, daimyō of Sagami province in Kanto, her mother was probably Zuikeii-in, sister of Imagawa Yoshimoto. In 1554, she married Imagawa Ujizane, her cousin, as an agreement of the Kai-Sagami-Suruga alliance, of which she had five children. Due to their political marriage, the Hojo, Takeda, and Imagawa clans became allies.

However, in 1568, Takeda Shingen violated the agreement and invaded the Imagawa. In 1571, Ujiyasu died, and his last wish was to renew his alliance with Takeda. Instead, she ran away with her husband and joined Tokugawa. In 1590, Toyotomi Hideyoshi invaded the Hojo during the Siege of Odawara. Hayakawa's brothers and mother died. She died in 1613 in Edo. Lady Hayakawa and Imagawa Ujizane were the only couple in the Kai-Sagami-Suruga alliance who did not divorce.  They continued to live together for the rest of their lives.

Her grave stands at Kansen-ji in modern-day Suginami, Tokyo.

Family
Father: Hōjō Ujiyasu
Father-in-law: Imagawa Yoshimoto
Husband: Imagawa Ujizane
Sons: 
Imagawa Norimochi
Shinagawa Takahisa

Further reading
Turnbull, Stephen (2002). War in Japan: 1467-1615, Oxford: Osprey Publishing.

Go-Hōjō clan
16th-century Japanese people
Women of medieval Japan
16th-century Japanese women
17th-century Japanese women
17th-century Japanese people
1613 deaths